Inside Out is the seventh studio album by progressive metal band Fates Warning, released on July 26, 1994 through Metal Blade Records. The album continues with the commercial sound that Parallels began. It was the last to feature long-time bassist Joe DiBiase, who left after its release, as well as the last to feature guitarist Frank Aresti until his return to band in 2005. Aresti later appeared on their 2013 album Darkness in a Different Light as a full-time member and on the 2016 album Theories of Flight as a guest. DiBiase would return in 2010 and 2016 for a number of shows, but did not officially rejoin.

This album was re-released in 2006 in Germany as part of a 2-CD Set with the album Disconnected featuring bonus tracks.

Original Track listing

Metal Blade Records re-mastered 2012 version

On June 5, 2012, the album was remastered with a second disc of live and demo material, along with a DVD with videos and the album played live.

Disc 1 - Original album remastered

Disc 2
All live tracks were recorded at Düsseldorf, February 11, 1995

DVD - Inside Out Live

DVD EXTRAS
 Live In Still Water (1994)
 Through Different Eyes (1995)
 Guardian (Mike Portnoy Drums) (1994)
 Shades of Heavenly Death (1995)
 MTV Europe Interview (1995)
 Eye to Eye (1994/1995)
 Face The Face Of Fear (1994)
 Don't Follow Me (1994)
 Shortest Show Ever (1994)
 Guardian (Arch/ Alder Duet) (1994)

Credits
 Ray Alder - Vocals
 Jim Matheos - Guitar
 Frank Aresti - Guitar
 Joe DiBiase - Bass
 Mark Zonder - Drums & Percussion
 Produced by Bill Metoyer & Fates Warning
 Recorded by Bill Metoyer during May 1994 at Track Record, North Hollywood and Silver Cloud, Burbank, CA
 Mixed at Cornerstone Recorders, Chatsworth, CA
 Assistant Engineers - Mike Ainsworth & Eric Stitt Greedy
 Guest Musicians - George Hideous, Fidel Horrendous, Sal Mortadelli, Arthur Letsgoberg, Mike White
 Mastered at Futuredisc by Eddy Schreyer
 Art Direction & Design - Hugh Syme
 Band Photography - Mark Husmann
 Reptilian Portrait - Tony Frederick

Fates Warning albums
1994 albums
Metal Blade Records albums